Ella Leffland (born November 25, 1931) is an American novelist and short story writer. Highly regarded by other writers, her novels demonstrate stunning mastery of the techniques of realistic fiction; but Leffland uses her facility to illuminate characters whose imaginative lives are rich and often strange. The settings of most of her works are in northern California, where she grew up; she is perhaps best known for her semi-autobiographical novel Rumors of Peace (1979; reprinted as a "rediscovered classic" in 2011) about a girl coming of age during World War II. The fascination with personal and social evil that Leffland explores in Rumors of Peace emerges powerfully in her ambitious historical novel based on the life of Hermann Göring, Knight, Death and the Devil, published in 1990.

Biography
Leffland was born and raised in Martinez, California. She attended San Jose State University.
Her story "Last Courtesies", published in Harper's Magazine, won an O. Henry Award First Prize in 1977. She has written five novels and a collection of short stories, including Mrs. Munck (1970), a gothic tale of a woman's vengeance on the man who abandoned her decades before, made into a film adapted, directed, and starring Diane Ladd). She has also written book reviews for The New York Times Book Review.

Leffland won the 2014 Gina Berriault Award from Fourteen Hills Review at San Francisco State University. Leffland resides and continues to write in San Francisco.

Bibliography
 Mrs. Munck (1970)
 Love Out of Season (1974)
 Rumors of Peace (1979)
 Last Courtesies and Other Stories (1980)
 The Knight, Death and the Devil (1990)
 Breath and Shadows (1999)

References

External links
Reading group guide to  Breath and Shadows 
New York Times book reviews of  Knight, Death and the Devil by Thomas Keneally ("The Fuhrer's Right-Hand Man") and by Herbert Mitgang ("The Life and Times of Goring, as Fiction")
Ella Leffland speaking for Martinez, California Oral History project 
Writers without Computers: Ella Leffland by Sarah Broderick 

1931 births
Living people
20th-century American novelists
American women novelists
American women short story writers
O. Henry Award winners
People from Martinez, California
Writers from San Francisco
San Jose State University alumni
20th-century American women writers
20th-century American short story writers
Novelists from California
21st-century American women